JDB Group is a Chinese manufacturer of nonalcoholic beverages, headquartered in Dongguan, Guangdong province in the People's Republic of China.
Its herbal tea products are among the most popular beverages in China, competing with brands like Pepsi and Coca-Cola in Chinese market. It has been dubbed “China’s Coca-Cola” because of its huge success in its home market.

References

External links 
 

Companies established in 1995
Drink companies of China
Privately held companies of China
Companies based in Dongguan
Chinese drinks